The River Oykel ( or) is a major river in northern Scotland that is famous for its salmon fishing. It rises on Ben More Assynt, a few miles from Ullapool on the west coast of Scotland, and drains into the North Sea via the Kyle of Sutherland. Traditionally it has marked the boundary between Ross to the south and Sutherland to the north.

Etymology 
The name Oykel is of uncertain derivation, but may be of Pictish origin. Firstly, this an other similar hydronyms may involve the element og, meaning "lively" (c.f River Ogwen, Wales), suffixed by the diminutive -ell. Secondly, Oykel may represent Pictish *ogel meaning "ridge", although long rivers are rarely named after minor local features. The hypothesis of a derivation from an equivalent of Welsh uchel has been suggested, but judged unlikely.

Geography
The upper valley is known as Glen Oykel (Gleann Oiceall) and is mostly desolate moorland; the lower valley is known as Strath Oykel (Srath Oiceall). The eponymous hotel is famous among anglers, who are obliged to stay there when fishing the river.

The River Cassley feeds into the Oykel by Invercassley (Inbhir Charsla), forming the Kyle of Sutherland which is later joined by the River Shin and the River Carron. The Kyle discharges into the North Sea via the Dornoch Firth.

History
The Oykel was known to the Vikings as the Ekkjal. It served as the boundary between the ancient Pictish province of Cat (Sutherland and Caithness), and the province of Ross, a role it continued until the two were merged into the Highland Region in 1975.

In 1406, the Mackays defeated the Clan MacLeod of Lewis at the Battle of Tuiteam Tarbhach on the north bank near the mouth of the Tutim Burn.

Flora and fauna
It is designated as a Special Area of Conservation. It has abundant stocks of Atlantic salmon and over 1000 were caught by anglers in 2007.

External links
 River Oykel at the Gazetteer for Scotland site
 Special Area of Conservation data at the Joint Nature Conservation Committee site

Notes and references

Oykel
Orkneyinga saga places